Island View is a resort village in the Canadian province of Saskatchewan within Census Division No. 6. It is on the shores of Last Mountain Lake in the Rural Municipality of McKillop No. 220.

History 
Island View incorporated as a resort village on January 1, 1994.

Demographics 

Government 
The Resort Village of Island View is governed by an elected municipal council and an appointed administrator that meets on the fourth Saturday of every month. The mayor is Raymond Olson and its administrator is Pamela Holliday.

See also 
List of communities in Saskatchewan
List of municipalities in Saskatchewan
List of resort villages in Saskatchewan
List of villages in Saskatchewan
List of summer villages in Alberta

References

External links 

Resort villages in Saskatchewan
McKillop No. 220, Saskatchewan
Division No. 6, Saskatchewan